William Gregg VC DCM MM (27 January 1890 – 10 August 1969) was an English recipient of the Victoria Cross, the highest and most prestigious award for gallantry in the face of the enemy that can be awarded to British and Commonwealth forces.

Details
He was 28 years old, and a sergeant in the 13th Battalion, The Rifle Brigade (Prince Consort's Own), British Army during the First World War when he performed a deed for which he was awarded the Victoria Cross.

On 8 May 1918 at Bucquoy, France, when all the officers of Sergeant Gregg's company had been hit during an attack on an enemy outpost, he took command, rushing two enemy posts, killing some of the gun teams, taking prisoners and capturing a machine-gun. He then started to consolidate his position until driven back by a counter-attack, but as reinforcements had by now come up, he led a charge, personally bombed a hostile machine-gun, killed the crew and captured the gun. When driven back again, he led another successful attack and held on to his position until ordered to withdraw.

Further information
He later achieved the rank of company sergeant-major and served in World War II with the Sherwood Foresters.

The medal
His Victoria Cross is displayed at the Royal Green Jackets (Rifles) Museum in Winchester, England.

Local honours
William lived in Heanor, Derbyshire, and as testament to his deeds of gallantry when the town's new swimming baths were built in 1970 they were named the 'William Gregg V.C Swimming Baths' in his honour. That recognition was continued when the facilities were extended and privatised in 2009-10 as the 'William Gregg V.C. Leisure Centre.

References

Monuments to Courage (David Harvey, 1999)
The Register of the Victoria Cross (This England, 1997)
VCs of the First World War - Spring Offensive 1918 (Gerald Gliddon, 1997)

External links
Location of grave and VC medal (Derbyshire)
Leisure Facilities Named in his honour (Heanor Leisure Centre)
 The Comprehensive Guide to the Victoria & George Cross

1890 births
1969 deaths
People from Heanor
Rifle Brigade soldiers
British World War I recipients of the Victoria Cross
Recipients of the Distinguished Conduct Medal
Recipients of the Military Medal
British Army personnel of World War I
Sherwood Foresters soldiers
British Army recipients of the Victoria Cross
Military personnel from Derbyshire